Margaret E. Ingalls  (September 16, 1939 - January 9, 2018), known by her pen name Nema Andahadna or simply Nema, was an American occultist, ceremonial magician, and writer best known for her magical writings about the Ma'atian current.

Early life and education
Margaret E. Cook was born on September 16, 1939, in Cincinnati, Ohio, to William Maurice and Edna Rita (Specht) Cook. She attended Mount St. Joseph University where she earned a Bachelor’s degree in English and Journalism. After graduating, she worked in market research.

Writing career
Nema Andahadna practiced and wrote about magick (magical working, as defined by Aleister Crowley) for over thirty years. In 1974, she channelled a short book called Liber Pennae Praenumbra.

From her experience with Thelemic magick, she developed her own system of magic called Maat Magick which has the aim of transforming the human race.  In 1979, she co-founded the Horus-Maat Lodge. The Lodge and her ideas have been featured in the writings of Kenneth Grant.

Her writings have appeared in many publications, including the Cincinnati Journal of Ceremonial Magick, Aeon, and Starfire. According to Donald Michael Kraig:

Personal life
Nema married Michael David Ingalls. She had one son and three daughters from previous marriages.

Nema died on January 9, 2018, at Riverside Methodist Hospital in Columbus, Ohio.

Works

Partial bibliography

 (Text of lecture delivered 4/10/2004 at the Thelemic Conference held at Conway Hall, London)

Discography

See also
IPSOS

References

Citations

Works cited

 Contains a lengthy account of the writing of Nema's Liber Pennae Praenumbra.
 Contains a photo facsimile of Liber Pennae Praenumbra.

Further reading

External links

The Horus / Maat Lodge, a website containing collective work

1939 births
2018 deaths
American occult writers
American Thelemites
Ceremonial magicians